Govinda III (reign 793–814 CE) was a famous Rashtrakuta ruler who succeeded his illustrious father Dhruva Dharavarsha. He was militarily the most successful emperor of the dynasty with successful conquests-from Kanyakumari in the south to Kannauj in the north, from Banaras in the east to Broach (Bharuch) in the west. He held such titles as Prabhutavarsha, Jagattunga, Anupama, Kirthinarayana, Prithvivallabha, Shrivallabha,  Vimaladitya, Atishayadhavala and Tribhuvanadhavala. From the Someshvara inscription of 804 it is known that Gamundabbe was his chief queen. Govinda III was undoubtebly the ablest of the Rashtrakuta emperors, unrivalled in courage, generalship, statesmanship, and martial exploits.The Rashtrakutas would reach their absolute peak under his rule.

War of Succession
Though Govinda III became the emperor it was not before having to face some internal family feuds. Govinda III ascended the throne in A.D. 793 and, as was expected, his accession did not go unchallenged. For a time his elder brother Stambha kept quiet, but when he was assured of the support of a number of feudatories and neighbours, he broke out in open revolt against hiss brother. Govinda, however, quelled the rebellion of “twelve kings headed by Stambha” and took his brother prisoner. Govinda, however, treated him leniently and, being convinced of his loyalty in future, Govinda took the magnanimous step of reinstating him in the Gagnga viceroyalty. Throughout the rest of his life, Stambha remained loyal to his plighted word, ending the war of succession.

Capture of Kannauj

From his capital in Mayurkhandi in Bidar district, Govinda III conducted his northern campaign in 800 C.E.. He successfully obtained the submission of Gurjara-Pratihara Nagabhata II, Dharmapala of Pala Empire and the incumbent puppet ruler of Kannauj, Chakrayudha. It is said Nagabhata II ran away from the battle field. The Sanjan plates of Govinda III mentions that the horse of Govinda III drank the icy liquid bubbling in the Himalayan stream and his war elephants tasted the holy waters of the Ganges. The rulers of Magadha and Bengal also submitted to him. An inscription of 813 states the Govinda III conquered Lata (southern and central Gujarat) and made his brother Indra the ruler of the territory. This in effect became a branch of the Rashtrakuta Empire. However, another opinion is Govinda III had control over the regions between Vindhyas and Malwa in the north to Kanchi in the south, while the heart of his empire extended from the Narmada to Tungabhadra rivers.
After the conquest of Malwa Govinda III ensured the Paramara dynasty would rule as vassals of the Rashtrakuta dynasty in 800 CE.

Southern conquests
 
The Eastern Chalukyas who had taken an antagonistic stand against the Rashtrakutas again had to face the wrath of Govinda III, who defeated Chalukya Vijayaditya II and installed Bhima Salki as its ruler. He further defeated the king of Kaushal (Kosala) and occupied parts of Andhra and defeated Pallava Dantivarman in 803 at Kanchi. He even obtained the submission of the King of Ceylon without even going to battle. The King of Ceylon is said to have sent him two statues, one of himself and another of his minister as an act of submission. The Nasari record states that now all the kingdoms of Tamil country, the Cholas, Pandyas and the Keralas paid their tribute to Govinda III.

Never had the Rashtrakuta Empire reach such levels of military success and zenith of glory. Govinda III died in 814. His brother Indra during this time founded the Gujarat (Lata) branch. He was succeeded by his son Amoghavarsha I.

Notes

References

External links
 History of Karnataka, Mr. Arthikaje

814 deaths
Hindu monarchs
Rashtrakuta dynasty
8th-century Indian monarchs
9th-century monarchs in Asia